Charlie Stewart (born c. 1910, date of death unknown) was an Australian rules football player and coach.

Playing career
Stewart played for Preston in the Victorian Football Association between 1941 and 1951, captaining the team in 1950 and 1951. He was the last pre-war player to play for Preston.

Coaching career
After moving into coaching in 1960, Stewart coached Preston teams to four premierships in as many years. This included coaching premierships in three separate grades between 1961 and 1963. In 1964 he resigned as head coach after Preston were relegated to the VFA second division.

References

Australian rules footballers from Victoria (Australia)
Preston Football Club (VFA) players
Preston Football Club (VFA) coaches
1910s births
Year of death missing